Dutch process may refer to:

 Dutch process cocoa
 Dutch process paint